Ras Maska (also Ra's Maska or Ras Masqa, Lebanese Arabic: Rāṣ Masʾa, written as "رَأْسُ مَسْقَا", Classical , Syriac: ܪܺܫܳܐ ܡܰܣܩܳܐ) is a village located in the Koura District in the North Governorate of Lebanon.

Geography
This village is located in the Koura district on the hills overlooking the Mediterranean to the south of Tripoli. It is divided between the northern and southern regions.

Northern Ras Maska, is the lowest part of the village, located at 60 meters (200 ft) above sea level. The religious majority of the northern population is Sunni Muslim.  It witnessed an important economic development due to its excellent location that hosts many coastal beach resorts, also, Northern Ras Maska is known for its olive agriculture..

Southern Ras Maska is the highest part of the village, located at 200 meters (660  ft) above sea level. The religious majority is Christian,  including Greek Orthodox and Maronites.

Population

Families of Ras Maska include, but are not limited to: Abdo, Antoun, Bou Chahine, Dabboussi, Dib, El-Kari, Fahd, Ghajar, Hajj Youssef, Hraiky, Jalloul, Lattouf, Nakhoul, Sarouni, and Sleiman.

Etymology and names

The name of the village is probably derived from the Aramaic language, ras meaning top and maska meaning drinking stream." The equivalent meaning could be the top of the stream. Due to the geography of the village, this translation is more likely correct than  the equivalent Arabic translation: top of irrigation''.

Many believe that Ras Maska's name is also derived from the Syriac word meaning "the ascension and progress."  The town maintains an old, 3 km long tunnel called Al-Naqra, which is believed to have been constructed to irrigate the gardens of Tripoli. What appear to be tombs have been found in the area of Al-Khirbeh, and according to local legend the town's land is filled with buried gold jars.

History
Ras Maska first appears in the Ottoman census of 1519. It belonged to the Nahiyat Koura / Anfeh and was inhabited by 14 male adults (more than 15 years old), 80% of them being married. If we adopt the estimation of the Historians), the number of inhabitants of Ras Maska in 1519 would have been of 70 persons.

In the Ottoman census of 1571, the number of male adults was 26. The population of Ras Maska practically doubled over the period, growing on average by 12 per mil per year to be compared to a growth of the number of inhabitants in the Nahiyat of 6.7% per mil per year.

Facilities, services and attractions
 Home to the Lebanese University - North Lebanon Campus
 Centre universitaire du Liban-Nord - Université Saint-Joseph
 HARIRI Canadian University - North Campus 
 Hospital Albert Haykel
 Ras Maska Volley-Ball Club
 Ras Maska Rd.Today and Rd.Tommorow
 Ras Maska Steel Bridge
 Ras Maska Red Bridge
 Ras Maska Square
 Tripoli Beton
 Perla

References

External links
Ras Masqa, Localiban
 Municipalité de Ras Maska
 Lycée Franco-Libanais Alphonse De Lamartine

Populated places in the North Governorate
Koura District
Populated places in Lebanon
Eastern Orthodox Christian communities in Lebanon
Sunni Muslim communities in Lebanon
Maronite Christian communities in Lebanon